Sherzod Namozov (born 3 August 1992) is a visually impaired Uzbekistani Paralympic judoka. He gold medalled at the 2016 Summer Paralympics in the Men's 60kg Category.

References

Judoka at the 2016 Summer Paralympics
Paralympic gold medalists for Uzbekistan
Living people
1992 births
Uzbekistani male judoka
Medalists at the 2016 Summer Paralympics
Paralympic medalists in judo
Paralympic judoka of Uzbekistan
21st-century Uzbekistani people